Ian Purdie (born 7 March 1953 in Bellshill) is a Scottish former footballer who played as a winger.

He started his professional career at Aberdeen before moving on to Dundee and then Motherwell.

Following a disagreement with his manager at Motherwell, Purdie moved to Wigan Athletic, and was the club's first signing after being elected into the Football League. He made his debut in the club's first ever Football League game against Hereford United, and in October 1978, he became the scorer of Wigan's first successful penalty in the Football League against Northampton Town.

Purdie signed for Portsmouth in October 1979 for a fee of £20,000, but made just five appearances for the club. However, he did score the crucial 2nd goal when Portsmouth beat Northampton 2–0 on 3 May 1980 to secure promotion to Division 3. He moved to the Australian capital in 1981 to play for Canberra City in the National Soccer League, before transferring to Melbourne-based Footscray JUST in 1983.
And if he ever reads this, perhaps he'll return the only autographed copies of 'The League at Last' that he 'borrowed' ...

References

External links

Ian Purdie at Aussie Footballers

1953 births
Living people
Footballers from Bellshill
Scottish footballers
Association football wingers
Aberdeen F.C. players
Dundee F.C. players
Motherwell F.C. players
Wigan Athletic F.C. players
Portsmouth F.C. players
English Football League players
Canberra City FC players
National Soccer League (Australia) players
Scottish expatriate footballers
Expatriate soccer players in Australia
Scotland under-23 international footballers
Scottish expatriate sportspeople in Australia